Leibbrandt is a surname. Notable people with the surname include:

 Robey Leibbrandt
 Georg Leibbrandt
 Shari Leibbrandt-Demmon, Canadian-Dutch curling coach

See also
 Lybrand
Leibbrand
 Liutprand (disambiguation)

See also
 Leibbrandt.com